= Asia Pacific Daily =

- President: Ju Mengjun
- Founded: July, 2012
- Language: Chinese, English
- Headquarters: Hong Kong
- Website: apdnews.com

Asia Pacific Daily (Abbreviation: APD, Chinese: 亚太日报) is a multilingual new media platform launched in July 2012 by the Asia-Pacific Regional Bureau of the Xinhua News Agency.Headquartering in Hong Kong, the agency has branch offices in Beijing, Shanghai, Guangzhou, Shenzhen as well as several major foreign cities including Colombo, Bangkok, Sydney, Kathmandu and Jakarta.

== History ==
In July 2012, Asia Pacific Daily was launched by Xinhua News Agency's Asia-Pacific Regional Bureau.

== Net Media ==
As a new multilingual new media platform, Asia Pacific Daily operates APD news website in Chinese and English with eight sub-websites including Australia, Japan, Sri Lanka, Nepal, Thailand, Singapore, Vietnam and DPRK, as well as Free Trade Zone Observers to publish articles on free trade zones in China.

== Paper Media ==
=== Foreign Edition ===
APD publishes subsidiary newspaper and joint newspaper including Ceylon Chinese News in Sri Lanka, Thai Xinhua Magazine in Thailand, Asia Pacific Nepal Edition, Indonesia Chinese Daily.

=== Asia Pacific Daily Extra ===
Asia Pacific Daily Extra is a bilingual customized quarterly publication. It is published by experienced financial and economic edited team, focusing on significant issues such as China-ASEAN development and cooperation, construction of free trade zone and "One Belt One Road" Initiative.

== Management ==
- President: Ju Mengjun
- Vice President and General Manager: Andy Jin.
